Don Quixote is a 2000 television film made by Hallmark Entertainment and distributed by TNT. It was directed by Peter Yates, and the teleplay, by John Mortimer, was adapted from Miguel de Cervantes' classic novel  Don Quixote. The film was shown in three parts in Europe but in one installment in the U.S.

The film was produced by Dyson Lovell, with Robert Halmi Sr. and John Lithgow as executive producers, and cinematography by David Connell. The original music is by Richard Hartley. The film stars Lithgow as Don Quixote de La Mancha (Quixote's real name is Alonso Quijano), and Bob Hoskins as Sancho Panza, and features Isabella Rossellini, Vanessa Williams, Lambert Wilson, Amelia Warner, Tony Haygarth, Peter Eyre, Lilo Baur, James Purefoy, and Trevor Peacock.

Production
Yates had not worked in television since the 1960s but was persuaded to try it by his friend John Frankenheimer. "He said I should do some TV, that it could be fun as long as you take the same care as you do with feature films--get good actors, do something that's going to be special. It was good advice."

He discovered a friend of his, John Mortimer, had just written a script of Don Quixote and offered it to Yates to read. "I did, and I really liked it," said Yates. "When my agent established no director was attached, I went to see [producer] Robert Halmi and said I'd like to make 'Quixote'." By coincidence, Yates had been attached in the 1970s to direct a film version of Don Quixote, based on a screenplay by Waldo Salt, which would have starred Richard Burton in the lead and Peter O'Toole as Sancho Panza; the film was never produced.

Home media

Of all the Hallmark adaptations of classic novels which premiered on Turner Network Television, only Don Quixote is still unavailable on a U.S. DVD. The film was made in English and released on VHS shortly after it was telecast in the U.S. and a region 2 DVD (PAL) was released by Hallmark in 2002, there are also a dubbed-into-Spanish version distributed by Divisa Home Video (Spain), and a DVD available with English or Russian-dubbed voices, with subtitles in Estonian, Latvian, Lithuanian, and Russian.

Awards and nominations
The film was nominated for three Primetime Emmys, and John Lithgow was nominated for a Screen Actors Guild Award.

References

External links
 

2000 television films
2000 films
TNT Network original films
Films set in Spain
Works by John Mortimer
Films based on Don Quixote
Films directed by Peter Yates
Films set in the 1600s